Cordéac is a former commune in the Isère department in southeastern France. On 1 January 2017, it was merged into the new commune Châtel-en-Trièves.

Population

See also
Communes of the Isère department
Grande Tête de l'Obiou

References

Former communes of Isère
Isère communes articles needing translation from French Wikipedia